Baluwa may refer to:
Baluwa, Kathmandu
Baluwa, Kavrepalanchok 
Baluwa, Salyan